The Bryan House is a historic house at 105 Fayetteville Street in Van Buren, Arkansas.  Built in 1886, it is one of the city's finest Queen Anne Victorian houses, with asymmetrical massing, multiple gables and projecting bay sections, and elaborate exterior decoration.  The interior also has well-preserved woodwork, hardware and other decoration.  The house was built by Lewis Bryan as a summer house, and is notable beyond its architecture as the local headquarters for Bryan's cousin William Jennings Bryan during his runs for President of the United States.

The house was listed on the National Register of Historic Places in 1978.

See also
National Register of Historic Places listings in Crawford County, Arkansas

References

Houses on the National Register of Historic Places in Arkansas
Victorian architecture in Arkansas
Houses completed in 1886
Houses in Crawford County, Arkansas
National Register of Historic Places in Crawford County, Arkansas
Buildings and structures in Van Buren, Arkansas